Kasuya may refer to:

People
 Kasuya (surname)

Places
 Kasuya, Fukuoka, town in Kasuya District, Fukuoka Prefecture, Japan
 Kasuya, Tokyo, district of Setagaya, Tokyo, Japan